The 2004 First-Year Player Draft, Major League Baseball's annual amateur draft, was held on June 7 and 8.  It was conducted via conference call with representatives from each of the league's 30 teams.  The draft marked the first time three players from the same university were chosen in the 
first ten picks.

Source:  MLB.com 2004 Draft Tracker

First round selections

Supplemental first round selections

Compensation Picks

Other notable selections

Wade Davis, 3rd round, 75th overall by the Tampa Bay Devil Rays
Adam Lind, 3rd round, 83rd overall by the Toronto Blue Jays
Ian Desmond, 3rd round, 84th overall by the Montreal Expos
J. A. Happ, 3rd round, 92nd overall by the Philadelphia Phillies
Chris Iannetta, 4th round, 110th overall by the Colorado Rockies
Ross Ohlendorf, 4th round, 116th overall by the Arizona Diamondbacks
Casey Janssen, 4th round, 117th overall by the Toronto Blue Jays
Javy Guerra, 4th round, 118th overall by the Los Angeles Dodgers
Lucas Harrell, 4th round, 119th overall by the Chicago White Sox
Ryan Webb, 4th round, 127th overall by the Oakland Athletics
James Parr, 4th round, 131st overall by the Atlanta Braves  
Jake McGee, 5th round, 135th overall by the Tampa Bay Devil Rays
Mark Lowe, 5th round, 153rd overall by the Seattle Mariners
Ben Zobrist, 6th round, 184th overall by the Houston Astros
Troy Patton, 9th round, 274th overall by the Houston Astros
Justin Maxwell, 10th round, 291st overall by the Texas Rangers
Cory Wade, 10th round, 298th overall by the Los Angeles Dodgers
Steve Pearce, 10th round, 305th overall by the Boston Red Sox, but did not sign
Sam Fuld, 10th round, 306th overall by the Chicago Cubs
Michael Saunders, 11th round, 333rd overall by the Seattle Mariners
Andy Sonnanstine, 13th round, 375th overall by the Tampa Bay Devil Rays
Dexter Fowler, 14th round, 410th overall by the Colorado Rockies
Nick Adenhart, 14th round, 413th overall by the Anaheim Angels
Will Venable, 15th round, 439th overall by the Baltimore Orioles, but did not sign
Mark Reynolds, 16th round, 476th overall by the Arizona Diamondbacks
Lorenzo Cain, 17th round, 496th overall by the Milwaukee Brewers
J. P. Arencibia, 17th round, 513th overall by the Seattle Mariners, but did not sign
Jerry Blevins, 17th round, 516th overall by the Chicago Cubs
Cory Luebke, 18th round, 532nd overall by the Pittsburgh Pirates, but did not sign
Mark Trumbo, 18th round, 533rd overall by the Anaheim Angels
David Price, 19th round, 568th overall by the Los Angeles Dodgers, but did not sign
Micah Owings, 19th round, 576th overall by the Chicago Cubs, but did not sign
Jesse Litsch, 24th round, 717th overall by the Toronto Blue Jays
Dallas Braden, 24th round, 727th overall by the Oakland Athletics
Justin Ruggiano, 25th round, 748th overall by the Los Angeles Dodgers
Jonathan Sánchez, 27th round, 820th overall by the San Francisco Giants
Tyler Flowers, 27th round, 821st overall by the Atlanta Braves, but did not sign
Brad Lincoln, 28th round, 826th overall by the Texas Rangers, but did not sign
Jaime García, 30th round, 889th overall by the Baltimore Orioles, but did not sign
Jake Arrieta, 31st round, 918th overall by the Cincinnati Reds, but did not sign
Jeff Gray, 32nd round, 967th overall by the Oakland Athletics
Mike Dunn, 33rd round, 999th overall by the New York Yankees
David Hernandez, 34th round, 1016th overall by the Arizona Diamondbacks, but did not sign
Todd Frazier, 37th round, 1100th overall by the Colorado Rockies, but did not sign
James Russell, 37th round, 1097th overall by the Seattle Mariners, but did not sign
Kyle Blanks, 42nd round, 1241st overall by the San Diego Padres
Tony Sipp, 45th round, 1333rd overall by the Cleveland Indians
Chris Davis, 50th round, 1496th overall by the New York Yankees, but did not sign

NFL players drafted
Pat White, 4th round, 113th overall by the Anaheim Angels, but did not sign
Matt Moore, 22nd round, 653rd overall by the Anaheim Angels, but did not sign
Matt Cassel, 36th round, 1087th overall by the Oakland Athletics, but did not sign
Brian Brohm, 49th round, 1451st overall by the Colorado Rockies, but did not sign

Background
The San Diego Padres stayed close to home with the first overall pick of the 2004 First-Year Player Draft, tabbing high school shortstop Matt Bush from Mission Bay (CA) High School. Bush, the first high school shortstop taken first overall since the Seattle Mariners chose Alex Rodriguez in 1993, batted .450 with 11 home runs, 35 RBI and 12 stolen bases during his senior year. The 18-year-old helped lead the Buccaneers to two San Diego Section Division III championships in three years, setting state records for career hits (211) and runs scored (188) in the process.

Huston Street, drafted in the supplemental first round, was the first 2004 draftee to make the major leagues. Justin Verlander was the first 2004 draftee to be selected to an All-Star Game in 2007. Dustin Pedroia, drafted in the second round, was the first 2004 draftee to be selected to start an All-Star Game and the first to win a World Series championship and the first to win a League MVP Award. 

Three members of the 2003 NCAA Champions Rice Owls pitching staff were selected within the first eight picks.  The Baltimore Orioles could not reach an agreement with Wade Townsend leading to Tampa Bay drafting him in 2005. 

Nick Adenhart, who was selected in the 14th round by the Anaheim Angels, was killed in a car accident a day after his only start of the 2009 season.

During the 2012 season, first round picks Philip Humber, Homer Bailey, and Jered Weaver threw no hitters (Humber's was a perfect game).

External links
MLB.com - 2004 Draft page
MLB.com - 2004 Draft Tracker
MLB.com - Draft History

References

Major League Baseball draft
Draft
Major League Baseball draft